Brothers Jean-Pierre Dardenne  (born 21 April 1951) and Luc Dardenne  (born 10 March 1954), collectively referred to as the Dardenne brothers, are a Belgian filmmaking duo. They write, produce, and direct their films together.

The Dardennes began making narrative and documentary films in the late 1970s. They came to international attention in the mid-1990s with La Promesse (The Promise). They won their first major international film prize when Rosetta won the Palme d'Or at the 1999 Cannes Film Festival. Their work tends to reflect left-wing themes and points-of-view.

In 2002, Olivier Gourmet won Best Actor at Cannes for the Dardennes' Le Fils (The Son). In 2005, they won the Palme d'Or a second time for their film L'Enfant (The Child), putting them in an elite club, at the time, of only seven. Their film, Le Silence de Lorna (Lorna's Silence), won Best Screenplay at the 2008 Cannes Film Festival and was released in Europe in the fall. Their film The Kid with a Bike won the Grand Prix at the 2011 Cannes Film Festival, received one Golden Globe nomination and eight Magritte Award nominations. Jean-Pierre was the jury president for the Cinéfoundation and Short Films sections of the 2012 Cannes Film Festival. In 2015, their film Deux jours, une nuit (Two Days, One Night) received nine Magritte Award nominations (winning three) and one Academy Award nomination for Best Actress for Marion Cotillard. Their 2019 feature Young Ahmed won them the Best Director Award at the 2019 Cannes Film Festival. Their 2022 film Tori and Lokita won the 75th Anniversary Prize at the 2022 Cannes Film Festival.

Career 

Creators of intensely naturalistic films about working class life in Belgium, brothers Luc and Jean-Pierre Dardenne have created a notable body of work since 1996. With La Promesse (The Promise) (1996), Rosetta (1999), Le Fils (The Son) (2002), and L'Enfant (The Child) (2005), the Dardennes' films show young people at the fringes of society – immigrants, the unemployed, the inhabitants of shelters. Both Rosetta and L'Enfant were awarded the Palme d'Or at the Cannes Film Festival, the only two Belgian films ever to earn the honor.

The Dardennes were born and raised in Seraing in Liege, in Wallonia, the French-speaking region of Belgium. Jean-Pierre (born in 1951) studied drama while Luc (born three years later) studied philosophy. In 1975 they established Derives, the production company that produced the roughly sixty documentary films they made before branching into feature films. These films covered such topics as  Polish immigration, World War II resistance, a general strike in 1960. Their first two feature films, however, are rarely seen today: Falsch (1987) adapted from René Kalisky, featuring Bruno Cremer and Je pense a vous (1992). The Dardennes had their first international success with La Promesse (The Promise) in 1996.

With Rosetta the Dardennes turned their focus to the burdens – philosophical, spiritual, psychological – of unemployment. Émilie Dequenne, who had not acted in film before, and was awarded the Best Actress Prize at the Cannes Film Festival, is the title character, a young woman living with her alcoholic mother in a trailer park. The film is about Rosetta's search for purpose and to Rosetta purpose can only be found through work – she makes her way through Seraing's fringes for the most menial of positions; she catches fish in the muddy, murky stream by her trailer park. Rosetta was the first Belgian film ever to win the Palme d'Or at Cannes, coming in ahead of films by David Lynch, Pedro Almodóvar, Takeshi Kitano, and Raoul Ruiz. The film provided some impetus for a labor law designed to protect young workers like Rosetta shortly after the film's release. "'[I]t was pure chance,' Jean-Pierre insists. 'There was already a bill going through, and the minister took advantage of our award to call it the Rosetta Law. But we never intended to get laws changed.' Luc adds: 'Of course, we always hope our films will speak to people, disturb them, but we never hoped to change the world'."

Crimes and occupations again figure prominently in the Dardennes' fourth film, L'Enfant (The Child).  The film earned the Dardennes the Palme d'Or from Cannes, their second in seven years. L'Enfant won the André Cavens Award in 2005, making directors Jean-Pierre and Luc Dardenne fourth-time winners of the award.

The Dardenne brothers have a regular stable of collaborators (for all of their films the brothers share writing and directing credits), including cinematographer Alain Marcoen and editor Marie-Hélène Dozo. Jérémie Renier played Igor in La Promesse, Bruno in L'Enfant, Claudy in Le Silence de Lorna (Lorna's Silence), Guy in Le gamin au vélo (The Kid with a Bike), and Bryan's father in The Unknown Girl (La Fille inconnue). Olivier Gourmet, the main character of Le fils, has a brief cameo as a detective in L'Enfant. Like Rosetta'''s Emilie Dequenne, Déborah François, the seventeen-year-old lead in L'Enfant, was appearing in her first film. Luc Dardenne has described their process of working with actors as follows: "What we do with the actors is also very physical. The day filming begins we do not feel obliged to do things exactly the way they were rehearsed; we pretend that we are starting over from zero so that we can rediscover things that we did before. The instructions we give the actors are above all physical. We start working without the cameraman—just the actors and my brother and me. We walk them through the blocking, first one then the other, trying several different versions. They say but do not act their lines. We do not tell them what the tone of their lines should be; we just say that we will see once the camera is rolling. At this point there is no cameraman, no sound engineer, no lighting. Then we set up all the camera movements exactly and the rhythm of the shot, which is usually a long take. Doing it this way allows us the ability to modify the actors' movements or any small details."

The Dardennes often employ handheld cameras and use available light. In 2009, they signed a petition in support of director Roman Polanski, who had been detained while traveling to a film festival in relation to his 1977 sexual abuse charges, which the petition argued would undermine the tradition of film festivals as a place for works to be shown "freely and safely", and that arresting filmmakers traveling to neutral countries could open the door "for actions of which no-one can know the effects."

In June 2012, the brothers were invited to join the Academy of Motion Picture Arts and Sciences.

Their 2014 film Two Days, One Night was selected to compete for the Palme d'Or in the main competition section at the 2014 Cannes Film Festival. The film received nine nominations at the 5th Magritte Awards, winning three, including Best Film and Best Director. Marion Cotillard received an Academy Award nomination for Best Actress for her performance in the film, the first Oscar nomination for a Dardenne brothers film.

In 2014, their body of work was awarded the special prize of the 40th Anniversary of the Ecumenical Jury at the Cannes Film Festival.

In 2016, they released The Unknown Girl (La Fille inconnue), starring Adèle Haenel as a young doctor who lets the door buzzer of her small clinic go unanswered one evening after work hours and then grows determined to discover the identity of the young woman found dead nearby when the police see from a security tape that she had been the person ringing at the door.

Their 2019 film Young Ahmed, a film about a Belgian teenager embracing Islamic extremism, was nominated for the Palme d'Or at the Cannes Film Festival and they won the Best Director prize.

Their 2022 film Tori and Lokita, was nominated for the Palme d'Or at the Cannes Film Festival and won the 75th Anniversary Prize.

 Filmography 
 Features 

 Documentaries 

 Shorts 

 Honours 
 2005: Grand-Cross of the Order of the Crown (Belgium)
 2008: Film Award Cologne within the Cologne Conference

 Awards and nominations 

 References 

 Bibliography 
 Sebastiano Gesù (ed.), Etica ed estetica dello sguardo. Il cinema dei fratelli Dardenne, Catania, 2006.

 Further reading 
 Luc Dardenne Au dos de nos images, 1991–2005, éditions du Seuil, Paris, 2005 (a philosophical diary about the making of  his films and the one of his brother)
 Luc Dardenne, Sur l'affaire humaine, Le Seuil, 2012.
 Luc Dardenne, Au dos de nos images: Tome 2, 2005–2014 (2015)
 Feuillère, Anne. 2007. Cineuropa, 10 October 2007.
 West, Joan M., West, Dennis. "Taking the Measure of Human Relationships: An Interview with Jean-Pierre Dardenne and Luc Dardenne." Cineaste, Summer 2003, Vol. 28, Issue 3.
 Bickerton, Emilie. "The Art and Politics of the Dardenne Brothers." Cineaste, Spring2006, Vol. 31, Issue 2.
 Ansen, David. "An awakening."  Newsweek, 30 June 1997, Vol. 129, Issue 26.
 Kauffmann, Stanley. "In a Cruel City." The New Republic, 26 May 1997, Vol. 216, Issue 21.
 Cunneen, Michael. "Films take on the big issues power and faith." National Catholic Reporter, 12/03/99, Vol. 36, Issue 6.
 Smith, Gavin. "Promises Fulfilled." The Village Voice, 8 June 1999, Vol.
 Johnstone, Sheila. "The secret of the Dardenne brothers' Palme d'Or success." The Independent, 17 March 2006.
 Hoberman, J. "Acts of faith." The Village Voice, 8 January 2003, Vol. 48
 Scott, A.O. "A Father and the Boy Who Killed His Son." The New York Times, 28 September 2002, Vol. 152 Issue 52255
 Klawans, Stuart. "The Wild Child." The Nation, 10 April 2006, Vol. 282 Issue 14.
 Wolfreys, Jim. "Reality Bites." Socialist Review, December 2008, Issue 331.
 Mai, Joseph. "Jean-Pierre and Luc Dardenne". University of Illinois Press, 2010 
 Crano, R.d., "Furtive Urbanism in the Films of Jean-Pierre and Luc Dardenne," Film-Philosophy 13.1, April 2009.
 Dillet, B. and T. Puri, 'Left-over spaces: The cinema of the Dardenne brothers', Film-Philosophy, 17.1, 2013, pp. 367–82.
 Olivier Ducharme,  Films de combat. La résistance du cinéma des frères Dardenne, Montréal, Varia, 2017.
 Mayward, Joel, "The Scapegoat: The Dardenne Brothers' The Son." Bright Wall/Dark Room, Issue 81: "Sacrifice," 16 March 2020, .

 External links 

 
 
 
 
 
 
 Committed Cinema: The Films of Jean-Pierre and Luc Dardenne; Essays and Interviews
 Filmjourney.org: Interview with the Dardennes
 Interview with Jean-Pierre and Luc Dardenne, directors of Lorna's Silence with David Walsh on the World Socialist Web Site''

1951 births
1954 births
Living people
People from Liège Province
Belgian film directors
Belgian film producers
Belgian screenwriters
Sibling filmmakers
Filmmaking duos
French-language film directors
Directors of Palme d'Or winners
Cannes Film Festival Award for Best Director winners
European Film Award for Best Screenwriter winners
Grand Crosses of the Order of the Crown (Belgium)
Magritte Award winners
Cannes Film Festival Award for Best Screenplay winners